Pes (Latin for "foot") or the acronym PES may refer to:

Pes
 Pes (unit), a Roman unit of length measurement roughly corresponding with a foot
 Pes or podatus, a 
 Pes (rural locality), several rural localities in Russia
 Pes (river), a river in northwestern Russia
Pes (anatomy), zoological term for the distal portion of the hind limb of tetrapod animals
 Talipes equinovarus (pes equinovarus), clubfoot
 Talipes cavus (pes cavus), clawfoot
 Talipes planus (pes planus), flat feet
 Talipes valgus (pes valgus), valgus deformity of the foot
 Talipes varus (pes varus), varus deformity of the foot
 Pes anserinus (leg)
 Pes anserine bursitis, inflammatory of the inner knee at the bursa of the pes anserinus
 Parotid plexus, pes anserinus of the facial nerve

PES

Education
 PES University, formerly P.E.S. Institute of Technology, a university in Bangalore, India
 Providence Elementary School, an elementary school in Chesterfield County, Virginia

Computing
 Pro Evolution Soccer, a multi-platform video game series developed by Konami
 Packetized elementary stream, part of the MPEG communication protocol
 Peripheral Event System, an implementation of autonomous peripheral operations in microcontrollers
 PSTN Emulation System for IP Multimedia Subsystem (IMS)

Organizations
Postal Express Service, United States military mail during World War I
Power Engineering Society, now the Power & Energy Society of the Institute of Electrical and Electronics Engineers
Premier Election Solutions, formerly Diebold Election Systems
Party of European Socialists, a centre-left pan-European political party
Social Encounter Party, a Mexican former political party
Solidarity Encounter Party, a Mexican former political party
Philadelphia Energy Solutions, the corporate owner of the refinery involved in the 2019 Philadelphia refinery explosion

Science
 Pallasite Eagle Station, a pallasite meteorite grouplet
 Photoemission spectroscopy or Photoelectron spectroscopy, a measurement of a substance's binding energy using the photoelectric effect
 Poly(ethylene succinate), a type of polyester
 Polyester, an artificially produced organic chemical that is spun and woven to make fabric
 Polyethersulfone, a thermoplastic polymer
 Potential energy surface, in physics and chemistry
 Programmed electrical stimulation, a type of electrophysiologic study
 Pseudoexfoliation syndrome, an eye problem

Other
 PES (director) (born 1973), film director and animator born Adam Pesapane
 Passenger Environment Survey, quality-control system for transit systems
 Payment for ecosystem services, incentives offered to farmers or landowners
 Pensarn railway station, Gwynedd, Wales, by National Rail station code
 Price elasticity of supply, a measure used in economics
 PULHHEEMS, a system of grading physical and mental fitness used by Britain's armed forces

See also
 Pez (disambiguation)